Patrick Enright (11 April 1926 – 12 October 2009) was an Irish hurler who played as a full-back for the Limerick senior team.

Enright was a stalwart of the Limerick team throughout the 1950s. During that time he won one Munster winners' medal.

At club level, Enright won a club championship winners' medal with his local Ahane club.

References

1926 births
2009 deaths
Ahane hurlers
CIÉ people
Limerick inter-county hurlers